Swaby is a civil parish and village in the East Lindsey district of Lincolnshire, England, about  north from Spilsby, and  north-west from Alford. Whitepit is a hamlet half a mile west of the village.

History
Swaby is listed in the Domesday Book of 1086 as consisting of 21 households,  of meadow,  of woodland and two mills.

In 1934 a hoard of 178 silver denarii in a pot were found in the field called 'The Bog' at Swaby. Lincoln Museum acquired 162 of the coins, ranging from Marcus Antoninus and Nero to Hadrian. The remainder are in the British Museum.

The parish church is a Grade II listed building dedicated to Saint Nicholas. It was built in 1828 of red brick and has a small bell turret. Lucy Lyttelton Cameron, the children's author was buried here in 1858. An earlier church, dedicated to St Margaret, was removed by Henry Vane of Belleau manor around 1658. The site of the church is now a cottage garden.

Swaby CE School was built in 1857 as a National School; it closed in 1976.

The village hall occupies the site of the old Wesleyan Methodist chapel. The chapel was built in 1839, altered in 1866, and became a free Methodist chapel in 1869.

Special scientific interest
There is a designated Site of Special Scientific Interest (SSSI) in Swaby, noted under Section 28 of the Wildlife and Countryside Act 1981. The reason for the designation:
"This glacial overflow valley supports floristically diverse lime-rich marsh and unimproved chalk turf. The marsh borders a stream bisecting the valley floor and the interest of the glassland is increased by the terraced nature of the slopes."

Population

References

Villages in Lincolnshire
Civil parishes in Lincolnshire
East Lindsey District
Sites of Special Scientific Interest in Lincolnshire